Strelitsa-Pervaya is a rural locality (a selo) in Shebekinsky District, Belgorod Oblast, Russia. The population was 297 as of 2010. There are 2 streets.

Geography 
Strelitsa-Pervaya is located 57 km northeast of Shebekino (the district's administrative centre) by road. Zalomnoye is the nearest rural locality.

References 

Rural localities in Shebekinsky District